In physics, a kinetic term is the part of the Lagrangian that is bilinear in the fields (and for nonlinear sigma models, they are not even bilinear), and usually contains two derivatives with respect to time (or space); in the case of fermions, the kinetic term usually has one derivative only. The equation of motion derived from such a Lagrangian contains differential operators which are generated by the kinetic term. Unitarity requires kinetic terms to be positive.

In mechanics, the kinetic term is

In quantum field theory, the kinetic terms for real scalar fields, electromagnetic field and Dirac field are

Quantum field theory